Idiazabal is a town and municipality in the Goierri region of the province of Gipuzkoa, in the autonomous community of the Basque Country, northern Spain.

The area has given its name to the renowned Idiazabal cheese of the region, one of the best-known products of the Basque cuisine.

References

External links
 Official website of the municipal government 
 IDIAZABAL in the Bernardo Estornés Lasa - Auñamendi Encyclopedia (Euskomedia Fundazioa) 

Municipalities in Gipuzkoa